Wallace Costa Alves (born 13 August 1986) is a Brazilian professional footballer who plays as a centre-back.

Honours

Individual
Indonesian Soccer Awards: Best 11 2019

References

External links
 

1986 births
Living people
Footballers from Rio de Janeiro (city)
Brazilian footballers
Association football defenders
Centro de Futebol Zico players
Macaé Esporte Futebol Clube players
Friburguense Atlético Clube players
Grêmio Esportivo Brasil players
Kazma SC players
Al-Sulaibikhat SC players
Persela Lamongan players
PSIS Semarang players
Brazilian expatriate footballers
Brazilian expatriate sportspeople in Kuwait
Expatriate footballers in Kuwait
Brazilian expatriate sportspeople in Indonesia
Expatriate footballers in Indonesia
Campeonato Brasileiro Série C players
Kuwait Premier League players
Liga 1 (Indonesia) players